The 2019 Pinstripe Bowl was a college football bowl game played on December 27, 2019, with kickoff at 3:20 p.m. EST on ESPN. It was the 10th edition of the Pinstripe Bowl, and one of the 2019–20 bowl games concluding the 2019 FBS football season. Sponsored by the New Era Cap Company, the game was officially known as the New Era Pinstripe Bowl.

Teams
The game was played between the Michigan State Spartans from the Big Ten Conference and the Wake Forest Demon Deacons from the Atlantic Coast Conference (ACC). This was the first time that the two programs played against each other.

Michigan State Spartans

Michigan State entered the game with a 6–6 record (4–5 in conference). The Spartans finished in fifth place of the East Division of the Big Ten. Michigan State began their regular season 4–1, then lost five in a row (four of the losses were to ranked teams) before finishing with two wins.

Wake Forest Demon Deacons

Wake Forest entered the game with an 8–4 record (4–4 in conference). The Demon Deacons finished in a three-way tie for third place in the ACC's Atlantic Division. Wake Forest started 7–1, then ended their season with three losses in four games.

Game summary

Wake Forest jumped out to a 7–0 lead, when quarterback Jamie Newman hit Kendall Hinton for a 29-yard touchdown pass. The Spartans scored ten unanswered points, first on a Matt Coghlin field goal and then on a 15-yard interception return by Mike Panasiuk, to take the lead, 10–7. The Demon Deacons regained the lead on a second quarter touchdown pass from Newman to Donovan Greene, making the score 14–10. The Spartans answered again, scoring a touchdown on an 8-yard scramble by quarterback Brian Lewerke to go ahead 17–14. Newman then threw his third TD pass, this time to Jack Freudenthal, putting Wake Forest up 21–17. MSU tightened the gap to 21–20 with another Coghlin field goal just before halftime. In the third quarter, the lead changed for the fifth time, as Lewerke connected with Cody White for a 10-yard touchdown pass to give MSU a 27–21 lead. This proved to be the final score, as the Spartan defense held Wake Forest scoreless in the second half.

Brian Lewerke, who threw for 320 yards and one touchdown while adding a rushing touchdown, was named the game's Most Valuable Player.

Statistics

References

External links
 Game statistics at statbroadcast.com

Pinstripe Bowl
Pinstripe Bowl
Michigan State Spartans football bowl games
Wake Forest Demon Deacons football bowl games
Pinstripe Bowl
Pinstripe Bowl
2010s in the Bronx